Johnny Forzani (born November 3, 1988) is a former professional football player for the Calgary Stampeders in the CFL. Forzani played college football at Washington State University, where he tied an NCAA record for the longest touchdown reception, 99 yards against Arizona State in 2009. 

Forzani was selected by the Calgary Stampeders in the 2010 CFL supplemental draft. He had previously played for their junior team, the Calgary Colts, in 2007, where he was named rookie of the year and most outstanding receiver after leading the league in yardage per catch. He was also on the Stampeders' practice squad in 2007.

Forzani's father, Tom, played for the Stampeders for 11 years.

References

1988 births
Calgary Stampeders players
Living people
Players of Canadian football from Alberta
Canadian football people from Calgary
Washington State Cougars football players